Murray Warmath (December 26, 1912 – March 16, 2011) was an American football player and coach.  He served as the head football coach at Mississippi State University from 1952 to 1953 and at the University of Minnesota from 1954 to 1971, compiling a career college football record of 97–84–10.  In 1960, Warmath led the Minnesota Golden Gophers to a share of the Big Ten Conference title, an appearance in the Rose Bowl, and a national championship, the program's most recent to date.  The following season, Minnesota placed second in the Big Ten Conference and returned to the Rose Bowl.  Warmath's 1967 squad captured a share of a second Big Ten championship.

Playing and coaching career
Warmath played college football for the Tennessee Volunteers under legendary coach Robert Neyland. After graduation from college, Warmath was the line coach for one season and end coach for three seasons at Tennessee before entering military service during World War II. After the service, he was named head line coach at Tennessee, and then served in the same capacity at the United States Military Academy under Red Blaik; Vince Lombardi was the backfield coach at Army during those years. Warmath then spent two seasons (1952–1953) as head coach at Mississippi State University before resigning at the end of the 1953 season to take the Minnesota job.

After coming to Minnesota, Warmath had immediate success, leading the Gophers to a 7–2 record in his first season and a 6–1–2 record in 1956.  However, Warmath came under fire after three straight losing seasons in which the Gophers finished a combined 6–20, including the 1958 campaign in which the Gophers won only one game and the 1959 campaign in which the Gophers finished last in the Big Ten and won two games. Despite fans throwing garbage on his lawn and talk from Gopher boosters that the University should buy out the last two years of his contract, Warmath would survive the storm and the following season the Gophers won the Big Ten title, with an 8–1 record, and were declared national champions.

While at Minnesota, Warmath became one of the most successful coaches in Gophers' history, leading the team to two Big Ten titles and two Rose Bowls. His 1961 team was awarded a Rose Bowl berth by default after Ohio State, the conference champion, declined the invitation. The Big Ten Conference, at the time, did not allow the conference champion to go to the Rose Bowl back-to-back.  Warmath is the last Gophers coach to win a national championship, a Big Ten title, or a Rose Bowl. His 18-year tenure is the second-longest in school history behind only Henry L. Williams, and his 87 wins are second in school history behind only Bernie Bierman.

While coach, Warmath became known as a catalyst for social change, as he was one of the first major college coaches to take multiple black athletes in a single recruiting class. Quarterback Sandy Stephens, who was installed as the starting quarterback as a sophomore in 1959, was the first black All-American quarterback. With the national exposure of his bowl appearances, Warmath was able to recruit other top black athletes including future NFL stars Bobby Bell, Carl Eller, and Aaron Brown.

Warmath's tenure crested after the 1967 Big Ten title season. Following a 6–4 record in 1968, he posted losing records in his final three years. Following the 1971 season, Cal Stoll was hired as coach of the Gophers and Warmath was made an assistant to the athletic director. Warmath stayed in that role until 1978 when he took a job with the Minnesota Vikings as an assistant coach, a position he held for two seasons before becoming a regional scout for the team.

In 18 seasons at Minnesota, Warmath's teams amassed an 87–78–7 (.526) record and won eight games in a season three times. He compiled a career record of 97–84–10.

Later life
In 1992, Warmath worked with author Mike Wilkinson to publish a biography entitled The Autumn Warrior in which he recounts his 65-year association with football. Warmath remained in Minnesota after he retired from coaching and made public appearances well into his 90s and gave an extended interview as recently as 2007. The Gophers locker room at Minnesota's TCF Bank Stadium, which opened in 2009, is named after Warmath.  Warmath died on March 16, 2011, at the retirement community in Bloomington, Minnesota, where he resided.  Minnesota Governor Mark Dayton declared March 21, 2011, the date of his funeral at St. Stephen's Episcopal Church in Edina, Minnesota, "Murray Warmath Day".

Head coaching record

See also
List of presidents of the American Football Coaches Association

References

External links
 

1912 births
2011 deaths
American football ends
American football guards
Army Black Knights football coaches
Minnesota Golden Gophers football coaches
Mississippi State Bulldogs football coaches
Tennessee Volunteers football coaches
Tennessee Volunteers football players
United States Army personnel of World War II
People from Humboldt, Tennessee
Players of American football from Tennessee